The Swiss Theatre Awards is a distinction that is given out every year by the Federal Office of Culture (FOC), to personalities or groups of persons active in the Swiss theatre world.

The laureates are chosen by the federal theatre jury (FTJ) and non of the prizes are part of a competition.

The ceremony is part of the Swiss Theatre Encounter, with the first one being held in Winterthour. in 2014.

The Swiss Grand Award for Theatre/Hans Reinhardt Ring continues the tradition of the grand prize of the Hans Reinhardt Ring of the Swiss Theatre Society (STS). It rewards every year a personality of the Swiss theatre world, chosen by the FTJ, it is given out by a member of the STS. The prize is endowed with 100'000 Swiss francs and a publication is realized on the winner.
The prize for "exceptional actor", and "exceptional actrice" are each endowed with 30 000 Swiss francs.
From three to five Swiss Theater Awards, each endowed with 50 000 Swiss francs, are also given out by the jury to personalities or groups from the Swiss Theatre World.

References

External links
Official website

Swiss awards
Swiss theatre awards